Máiréad McAtamney-Magill  (born c. 1944 in Portglenone, County Antrim) is a retired Irish sportsperson. She played camogie with her local club Portglenone and with the Antrim senior inter-county team from 1958 until 1983.  McAtamney captained Antrim to the All-Ireland title in 1979.

References

Sources
 Corry, Eoghan, The GAA Book of Lists (Hodder Headline Ireland, 2005).
 Donegan, Des, The Complete Handbook of Gaelic Games (DBA Publications Limited, 2005).
 Fullam, Brendan, Captains of the Ash, (Wolfhound Press, 2002).

1940s births
Living people
Antrim camogie players
Date of birth missing (living people)
People from Portglenone